Along with the Simpson family, The Simpsons includes a large array of characters: co-workers, teachers, family friends, extended relatives, townspeople, local celebrities, as well as fictional characters within the show. The creators originally intended many of these characters as one-time jokesters or for fulfilling needed functions in the town. A number of them have gained expanded roles and subsequently starred in their own episodes. According to creator Matt Groening, the show adopted the concept of a large supporting cast from the Canadian sketch comedy show Second City Television.

The main episode characters, the Simpson family, are listed first; all other characters are listed in alphabetical order. Only main, supporting, and recurring characters are listed. For other recurring characters, see List of recurring The Simpsons characters.

Appearances

Characters

References

Citations

Bibliography

Lists of characters in American television animation by series
 
The Simpsons lists
Animated human characters

Simpsons, The
Simpsons, The